The 2018 FIBA Americas League was the 11th edition of the top-tier level intercontinental professional club basketball competition in the Americas, the FIBA Americas League. Sixteen teams from across the Americas competed over three rounds, to determine the champion.

Team allocation

Teams

The labels in the parentheses show how each team qualified for the place of its starting round (TH: Americas League title holders):
LC: Qualified through a licensed club with a long-term licence
1st, 2nd, etc.: League position after Playoffs
Notes

Group phase

Sixteen teams participated in the group phase, in which each team faced the other teams in the group once. Each group tournament was held at the arena of a host team. The two highest-placed teams in each group advance to the semifinal phase. Games were played from 19 January until 11 February 2018.

Group A
Venue: Monterrey, Mexico

Group B
Venue: Talca, Chile

Group C
Venue: Corrientes, Argentina

Group D
Venue: Bauru, Brazil

Semifinal phase
The eight teams which advance from the group phase, played in this stage in which each team faced the other teams in the group once. Each group tournament was held at the arena of a host team. The two highest-placed teams in each group advance to the final four. Games were played from 2 March until 11 March 2018.

Group E
Venue: Buenos Aires, Argentina

Group F
Venue: Corrientes, Argentina

Final Four
The final four tournament decided the champion of the 2018 season. The tournament was held from 24 March and 25 March 2018 in the Polideportivo Roberto Pando in Buenos Aires, Argentina.

Statistical leaders

References

2018
2017–18 in South American basketball
2017–18 in North American basketball